Kampong Labu Estate is a village in Temburong District, Brunei, about  from the district town Bangar. The population was 152 in 2016. It is one of the villages within Mukim Labu. The postcode is PB1151.

Facilities 
Labu Estate Primary School is the village's government primary school. It also shares grounds with Labu Estate Religious School, the village's government school for the country's Islamic religious primary education.

The village mosque is Kampong Labu Estate Mosque. It was inaugurated on 18 October 1982 and can accommodate 200 worshippers.

References 

Labu Estate